L system may refer to:

 L-system or Lindenmayer systems in biology
 L-carrier AT&T Transcontinental Cable System 
 Taito L System arcade system board
 An alternative name for Chicago "L" mass transit system
 The main system of transport for tyrosine across biological cell membranes and the blood–brain barrier.